"We Back" is a song recorded by American country music singer Jason Aldean. It is the lead single to his ninth studio album, 9. Tyler Hubbard of Florida Georgia Line wrote the song with Jordan Schmidt and Brad and Brett Warren, the latter two of whom are known as The Warren Brothers.

Content and history
Aldean said that the idea for the song came when he sent a request to Tyler Hubbard, one-half of the musical duo Florida Georgia Line, asking for a song with "tempo" to it. He wanted a song that would serve as an upbeat, rock-driven lead single to a new album, because the previous album (Rearview Town) was dominated by ballads. Within a few days, Hubbard contacted him with the finished song, which Aldean immediately liked and chose to record. The blog Taste of Country describes the song as a country rock anthem comparable in theme to "The Only Way I Know", "Gonna Know We Were Here", and "They Don't Know".

Charts

Weekly charts

Year-end charts

Certifications

References

2019 songs
2019 singles
BBR Music Group singles
Jason Aldean songs
Songs written by Tyler Hubbard
Songs written by Jordan Schmidt
Songs written by the Warren Brothers
Song recordings produced by Michael Knox (record producer)